"Pas toi" is a 1985 song recorded by French singer-songwriter and composer Jean-Jacques Goldman. It was the third and last single of his fourth studio album Non homologué and was released in April 1986. Fully composed by Goldman, it was successful in France.

Song information
The song is available on many albums by Goldman, including his live albums En Public, Du New Morning au Zénith and En passant tournée 1998, and his compilations Entre gris clair et gris foncé, Intégrale, Les Enfoirés à l'Opéra, Singulier 81/89 and Pluriel 90/96. The live version recorded in 1999 was very different from the original and had rap sounds; it also added lyrics in English sung by Michael Jones. The song deals with a non-reciprocal love and is not autobiographical.

In France, the single started at No. 13 on 26 April 1986 and reached a peak of number five for two non-consecutive weeks. It remained for seven weeks in the top ten and 21 weeks in the top 50 and achieved Silver status.

Cover versions
In 1997, the song was covered by French R&B band Melgroove and released as a single, becoming a hit in France and Belgium (Wallonia). This version is very different from the original one as the three voices of the singers are superposed in the chorus. In addition, the original structure of the song was changed since "Pas toi" begins with the chorus.

The song was performed by La troupe des Dix Commandements on French show Tapis rouge, broadcast of France 2 on 3 March 2001. Chorus Meps (1998), Michel Leclerc (2000, piano version) and the Collège de l'Estérel (2002) recorded a new version of the song.

Track listings
 7" single

 Digital download (since 2005)

Charts and sales

Peak positions

1 Melgroove version

Year-end charts

Certifications

References

1985 songs
1986 singles
1997 singles
Jean-Jacques Goldman songs
Songs written by Jean-Jacques Goldman
Epic Records singles